Fleischmann Glacier is a glacier in the Alaska Range of Denali National Park and Preserve in the U.S. state of Alaska. The glacier lies in the southern  Kichatna Mountains above Simpson Pass, moving south. It the source of Morris Creek, which feeds the Kichatna River.

See also
 List of glaciers

References

Glaciers of Matanuska-Susitna Borough, Alaska
Glaciers of Denali National Park and Preserve
Glaciers of Alaska